The Đồng Nai River is a river in Vietnam that originates in the Central Highlands region of the southern portion of the country. It is approximately 586 km in length, making it the longest river to be entirely located in Vietnam. It gives its name to Đồng Nai Province.

Geography
The Dong Nai River flows through the provinces of Lam Dong, Dak Nong, Binh Phuoc, Dong Nai, Binh Duong and Ho Chi Minh City with a length of over 437 km and a basin of 38,600 km², if calculated from the source of the  Đa Dâng River, it is 586 km long. From the confluence with the Đa Nhim River below the Pongour waterfall, it measures 487 km. The Dong Nai River flows into the East Sea in Cần Giờ District.

The main stream of Dong Nai river in the upstream is also known as the Đa Đang river. The river originates from Lam Vien plateau , meandering along the northeast-southwest direction from the mountains to the plateau in Ta Lai (Tan Phu district, Dong Nai province). The river forms the natural boundary between Đăk R'Lấp District (Dak Nong) and Bảo Lâm District, Lâm Đồng Province, Cát Tiên District, between Cát Tiên and Bù Đăng District, Tan Phu District, Dong Nai and between Tan Phu and Đạ Tẻh District.

After meeting the Bé River, the Dong Nai River forms a natural boundary between Dong Nai on the east and Bình Dương Province on the west bank. 

The river flows through Bien Hoa City, then flows along the boundary between Dong Nai and Ho Chi Minh City, between Ba Ria - Vung Tau and Ho Chi Minh City.

Hydropower
Major hydropower dams in the Dong Nai river basin:
 On the main Dong Nai river: Trị An Dam, Dong Nai 2, Dong Nai 3, Dong Nai 4, Dong Nai 5, Dong Nai 6 (in development) and Dong Nai 6A (in development). The Dong Nai 6 and 6A projects are controversial as they are likely to have a significant impact on the biodiversity of Cat Tien National Park.
 Bé River: Thac Mo dam, Cần Đơn dam
 Saigon River: Dau Tieng Lake
 Da Nhim River: Da Nhim dam
 Dai Ninh dam
La Nga River: Hàm Thuận – Đa Mi hydroelectric power stations

Gallery

References

External links
Diesel fuel spills into Dong Nai River, from the UNDP
Pictures of rural homes along the Đồng Nai River
Improving resource allocation and incomes in Vietnamese agriculture: A case study of farming in the Dong Nai River Basin, an International Food Policy Research Institute (IFPRI) discussion paper.

Rivers of Đồng Nai province
Rivers of Lâm Đồng province
Rivers of Bình Phước province
Rivers of Bình Dương province
Rivers of Đắk Nông province
Rivers of Ho Chi Minh City
Rivers of Vietnam